Guinea Grass is a village in the Orange Walk District of the nation of Belize. It is 38 metres (127 feet) above sea level. According to the 2000 census, Guinea Grass had a population of 2,510 people; by 2010 the census figures showed a population of 3,500. The population is made up of mostly Mestizos, Creoles, and East Indians. There are a number of Mennonites, Taiwanese and other Central American immigrants living near or immediately in the village.

Origin of Name

There are two stories which explain the origin of the village's name. The first is that, after the emancipation of slavery in the British Caribbean, indentured labourers from India, known as  "East Indians," settled in the area and began to plant and cultivate bananas for a British estate. The locals knew banana as "Guineo," and from there it morphed into "Guineal" and the then settlement became known as "Guinea Grass." The other version is that there was an Englishman an agent for the Belize Estate Company known as "Chichiri" Price, relative to the Rt. Hon. George Price who lived on a farm on the northern outskirts of the village and raised livestock. In order to feed the livestock he had grass imported from England and Mexico. The grass that he imported was Guinea Grass, (Megathyrsus maximus). The locals then began to call the community Guinea Grass after the imported grass scattered and spread beyond the farm and in to the community. The grass can still be seen on the outskirts of the village's main road towards the Philip Goldson Highway.

History

The area presently Known as Guinea Grass village limits, Tower hill area, and the San Juan Corridor were inhabited by the Maya through a number of linked Mayan settlement known as " Posito" or wells because of the vast amount of wells build by the Mayas on the area especially by the San Juan Corridor and along the river bank of the New River by the Guinea Grass main road.  Some wells can still be seen up to today and are used by farmers to water crops. Villagers of Guinea Grass have also spotted a tunnel made by the Mayas which runs from near the Catholic Church to a hilltop going to Ship Yard village by where the Pech family resides. As in most cases after the Europeans came to the Americas the population of the indigenous people declined and many settlements were abandoned which is exactly what happened in Posito.

Based on Oral History passed on by the older generations. The village started when a few runaway slaves from Crooked Tree and Belize River Valley and many light skinned (red skinned) who were half British and children of slave owners or daughter of English men ran away with black slaves or workers and settled by a stem of the New River not the main river which is presently Guinea Grass Village to not be found as marriage with a dark skinned person was not allowed. They settled in the community with the remaining Mayas of the area returning to the location. Later on came the Waiika and Mosquito people from the British Owned Nicaraguan Coast and a few families settled in the village along with a British farmer from the Belize Estate to cultivate the land.

Then in the 1800s after slavery was abolished in the British West Indies the British recruited indenture servants from China and India to come and work in agriculture at British Honduras. Then a British man opened a banana plantation and brought a couple of Indian labourers to cultivate and work on the plantation at Guinea Grass. After a short period of time in 1847 came the Mestizos ( mixture of Spanish and Maya), the Yucatec Mayas and the Yucatecos (Spaniards born in Yucatán Mexico to Spanish Parents or grand parents from both sides) to the north of Belize escaping La Guerra de Castas (the Caste War) of Yucatán, Mexico. The settlement composed with different ethnicity and different language speakers had to find ways of communication and soon used English creole as a means to communicate with different ethnic groups.

The mestizo population soon grew and outnumber the other cultures through intermarriages and high fertility rate. Although presently the number of households is lower in the village the Mestizo population is still the largest ethnic group followed by those identifying as mixed race. The community had no law officials or form of governance so justice was taken by their own hands and many white Spanish "Yucatecos" were feared because of that and many altercations with the wiika population arose due to cultural and economic differences. In the mid 1880s the Settlement was officially recognized by the colonial Governor of British Honduras as Guinea Grass and a representative of the crown, Mr Price and Belize estate, the Ayuso and Disus family were relocated in the village along with a militia Edward Alamilla from Corozal and a Primary School along with a catholic church with a teacher Mr Martinez a carib/ Garifuna from Silk Grass were established.
The villagers did subsistence farming in order to have food on the table as they were only paid BZD $10- $12 per month as chicleros and wood cutters and had to camp in the Yalbac Hills for months. The job and ways to have an income were based on a complex scheme as in order to have a job you had to owe to the colony or the Belize Land Estate so they were always in debt with leased land in order to be eligible to get a salary.

Tragedy stuck the village after the Yellow Fever epidemic struck the north of Belize which wiped out 2/3 of the then Orange Walk District capital San Esteban and due to that the District Capital was relocated to Present day Orange Walk Town. Many people were killed by the disease and the death rate out numbered the pace of coffin making hence a big hole was dug to place in the dead. Many count the times when they were playing with their friends and then they dropped dead in the middle of the game with their ears, nose and mouth bleeding. Many women while cooking dropped dead on the floor and infants while being breast fed started bleeding and died. It was a catastrophe in the community and across Belize. This along with the devaluation of the Belize Dollar in 1949 after WWII and the scarcity of food caused by the war delaying food product shipments to British Honduras and the rest of the West Indian territories brought in economic distress and greater dependencies to self sustainment as England was going through an economic crisis. in the 1950s a new set of people came to Belize running from religious persecution the Mennonites whom after various consultations and agreements with the Governor had their first settlement approved and it was in Shipyard Village about 4–5 miles away from the village which brought employment to the people of Guineas Grass.

After Hurricane Hattie hit Belize many Belizeans were granted residency to the United States and many people from Guinea Grass migrated to the US along with many other Belizeans back in the 60's and 70's 
In the 1960s during the rebuilding of the colony Guinea Grass was finally constructed a road connecting it to the presently Philip Goldson Highway.
In the late 80's Guinea Grass along with San Felipe, August Pine Ridge and San Lazaro got electricity thanks to the newly elected Area Representative Hon. Onesimo Pech who resided in the village at the time.

Language
The village is predominantly a Mestizo community. More than 89% of the population are Belizeans, hence Spanish followed by English are the predominant languages of the community with Spanish and 'Spanglish' spoken mostly at home and English taught at the primary schools, used to access public services and when watching Television. English Creole is used for trading with locals and other Belizeans so is Spanish. 89% of Guinea Grass residents can have an understandable conversation in Spanish with you but may tend to add English words along with it.70% can have an understandable conversation in English with you while 80% of the population understands English. 53% of the population understand or can speak English Creole.  It is a language on the rise in the village specially among the Younger Population. Spanglish is probably the most widely spoken language in the village a combination of Spanish and English mix on a conversation.

EXAMPLE:

 Excuse me, where is the police station located?- Scuse, donde esta located el police station? 
 what was your grade on the  spanish test ?-  Que fue tu grade en el Spanish test? 
 what time does the bank open? I want to make a loan appointment. - Que time hace open el bank, porque quiero hacer un loan.

More than half of toddlers born from 2008 to 2018 can understand both Spanish and English before entering school.

Profession
The people of Guinea Grass once survived by practicing subsistence farming and working in the chicle industry as chicleros and cutting mahogany and logwood. Since the early 1970s, most of the people in the north, including Guinea Grass, turned to the sugar industry as a factory was opened in Libertad Village and then at Tower Hill. In the late 1980s after independence, with a wave of infrastructural development carrying across Belize, many labourers from the village learnt trades in masonry, carpentry, electricity and plumbing and most of the male labour force aged 30–50 are still in those trades. Many younger people now have office jobs, work with government and even have their own businesses. Many young adults who can not afford a higher education work in the tourism and hospitality industry.

Nowadays many women also work and have a professional job, something that was rarely seen 15 years ago and many house hold are now double income household.

Climate
Guinea Grass has a tropical monsoon climate (Köppen: Am).

Population & Culture

The village of Guinea Grass is mostly a Mestizo dominated society hence heavily influenced by Spanish culture and tradition. Families are mostly patriarchal and the father gives or buys a piece of lot for his children before they become independent adults, previously only Sons were eligible for this but it changed by the beginning of the 21st century making daughters eligible as well. The Spanish language in the village has also been modified by the village's long history and influence of the Mayan and English Creole language. The village lifestyle has also been heavily influenced by American, Jamaican and Mexican culture in the way of dressing, standard of living, music etc. The most notable Mestizo tradition can be found on the food. Most typical foods from Guinea Grass are Mestizo foods such as salbutes, tamales, escabeche, chirmole, caldo (chicken soup), Tamalitos/ Dukunu. 
The village is also heavily influenced by Caribbean and creole culture also seen through many typical cuisines such as the national dish Rice & Beans, Boil up, Serre, Cow foot soup, creole bread, meat pies, Journey Cake, fry jack, Dumplings etc. We can wrap up by saying that the village has a Latin-Caribbean Mestizo culture.

Some of the most festive times of year in the village are Easter in which the village council does many family activities by the river side at the New River Park, followed by the September Celebrations which starts by commemorating the Battle of St George's Caye. Then by a beauty Queen pageant contest for Miss Guinea Grass on the 20th of September who will parade the village streets on independence day followed by a motorcade going to Orange Walk town to watch the flag raising ceremony and fireworks display. The independence day parade and celebration is on the 21st of September just after 1:00 PM. After this the villagers go to Orange Walk Town to see the Independence Carnival Parade.  The biggest festivity of the year is Christmas in which from the 24th Christmas Eve families gather to make traditional foods and pastries for Christmas. Many attend church that night and on the 25th People have food, drinks and pastries to share with neighbours, family and friends. It's a long lasting tradition of sharing in the village. The last festivity in the village is New Year's Eve Where the traditional tamales can be found on every home on New Year's Eve. Many churches across the village have New Years Programmes and many families host New Year's Eve Parties.

Politics
The Village was involved in the George Price Movement on the right to vote and have a voice after the 1949 devaluation of the Belizean Dollar. As only whites and selected coloureds (who owned land) could vote or take part in Government. in 1950 when the People's United Party was formed, the Village supported the party especially since the Rt. Hon. George Price lived in the village for a short period of time back in his tween years. They remained loyal to the Party until the late 1970s when Onesimo Pech the first person from the village decided to run for Area Representative of Orange Walk South for the United Democratic Party. Since then the village has been a strong hold for the United Democratic Party and has the biggest number of registered voters for the Orange Walk South Constituency.

The UDP has had the lead on village council election over the PUP, but in 2013 for the first time in the village history a newly formed third party won the village council elections The United Community Association of Guinea Grass (UCA) winning over the 3 consecutive reelected UDP council. On that election the PUP had no candidates to run for the village council.

The village council was previously formed by a full UDP slate with a woman being elected as the Chair-Lady for the Second time Mrs Myrna Santos. The first elected woman as Chair-Lady was Mrs Estella Perez-Santos. In 2019 after more than 20 years the PUP finally won the Village Council elections full slate with Benito Uck becoming the new appointed chairman.

Religion 
89% of the Populations identifies with the Christian faith while the other 11% have no religious affiliation. The high influence of Christianity was influenced by the strong Spanish and Mestizo culture. Specially to Catholicism. 
Until the late 1950s British and American missionaries along with Belizeans of Creole descent brought to the village the Protestant Christian movement under the religious Organization Full Gospel church of God which stills stands today and is the Oldest Evangelical denomination in the village. Soon after the Seven DAY Adventist came to establish a church in the village. On the early 1970s the full gospel church split. 

A new Evangelical church and mission was established in the village called Pentecostal Church of God "Rock Of Ages" This was the pioneer church for the PCG World mission  in Central America, Belize specifically its church in Guinea Grass is the mother Church of the PCG denomination in Central America and Parts of the English West Indies. 
Just until recently the evangelic churches which are presently 7 congregations have grown to the extent that 1 out of 2 villagers is either a Roman Catholic or Evangelical Christian.

Education
70% have a Primary School education; of the other 30% that did not finish primary school, 20% can read and write in both English and Spanish. The other 10% are illiterate. 45% have a secondary education, which has tripled in one decade as only ~12% of the population had a secondary education in the 1990s. 30% have a tertiary education and a hand full have graduate degrees.

 As the official Language of the country is English, All Primary schools in Belize teach with a full English curriculum. Hence, the same thing applies to Guinea Grass from infant division to Upper School (Standard 5 & 6) teaching is done in English but are not limited to use different languages for better illustration and understanding of the subject specially helpful for foreigners and those whose first language is not English such as  Spanish or Low German.

The village has two primary schools, namely Guinea Grass Pentecostal Primary School and Guinea Grass Roman Catholic Primary School.

Over the past 13 years the Guinea Grass Pentecostal School has ranked amongst the Top 25 schools nationwide and has consecutively ranked among the top 3 schools in the District, the categories vary each year due to the number of standard six students enrolled. (Each year they are on either the 25-35 categories or the 50- above category)

References

http://sib.org.bz/wp-content/uploads/2017/05/2003_Abstract_of_Statistics.pdf

http://sib.org.bz/
http://www.northernbelize.com/cult_mestizo.html
https://belize.com/orange-walk/
https://www.alexmphotography.com/belize-2015/

Populated places in Orange Walk District
Mestizo communities in Belize